Bhai Vir Singh (5 December 1872 – 10 June 1957) was an Indian poet, scholar, and theologian of the Sikh revival movement, playing an important part in the renewal of Punjabi literary tradition. Singh's contributions were so important and influential that he became canonized as Bhai, an honorific often given to those who could be considered a saint of the Sikh faith.

Family and personal life 
Born in 1872, in Amritsar, Bhai Vir Singh was the eldest of Dr. Charan Singh's three sons. Vir Singh's family could trace its ancestry as far back as to Diwan Kaura Mal, a vice-governor (Maharaja Bahadur) of the city Multan. His grandfather, Kahn Singh (1788–1878), spent a great deal of his youth training and learning traditional Sikh lessons in monasteries. Fluent in Sanskrit and Braj, as well as in the oriental systems of medicine (such as Ayurveda, Siddha and Yunani), Kahn Singh influenced his only son, Dr. Charan Singh, who later fathered Vir Singh, to become an active member of the Sikh community, often producing poetry, music, and writings in hopes of restoring the Sikh community. At seventeen, Bhai Vir Singh himself married Chatar Kaur and had two daughters with her. He died in Amritsar on 10 June 1957.

Education 
Bhai Vir Singh Ji had the benefit of both the traditional indigenous learning as well as of modern English education. He learnt Sikh scripture as well as Persian, Urdu and Sanskrit. He then joined the Church Mission School, Amritsar and took his matriculation examination in 1891 and stood first all over in the district. Singh received his secondary education at Church Mission High School, and it was while attending school that the conversion of some of his classmates from Sikhism to Christianity that Singh's own religious convictions toward Sikhism were fortified. Influenced by the Christian missionaries' use of and reference to literary sources, Singh got the idea to teach others the main dogmas of Sikhism through his own written resources. Using the skills and techniques in modern literary forms that he learned through his English courses, Singh produced stories, poems, and epics and recorded the history and philosophical ideas of Sikhism.

Literary career

Beginnings 
Singh chose to become a writer. After passing his matriculation examination, he worked with a friend of his father's, Wazir Singh, and set up a lithography press. His first commission to write and print were geography textbooks for some schools.

In 1893 at age 18, Dhani Ram Chatrik found employment at Wazir Singh's press and met Vir Singh, who advised him to learn lithograph engraving, and who inspired him to write poetry in the Punjabi language. The Wazir Hind Press was the main press publishing literature for the Singh Sabha movement, and Vir Singh would purchase it after Wazir Singh passed after illness. Thusly, he would begin a long association with Vir Singh, which would lead to contact with acclaimed writers, an 11-year career with the Press, and subsequently writing for the Khalsa Samachar, in which Chatrik would hone his poetic skills. His contact with Vir Singh turned him into an ardent admirer of the Sikh faith, influencing his syncretic poetic style that reflected composite Punjabi culture.

Language politics 
Singh argued that Sikhism was a unique religion which could be nourished and sustained by creating an awakening amongst the Sikhs of the awareness of their distinct theological and cultural identity. He aimed at reorienting the Sikhs' understanding of their faith in such a manner as to help them assimilate the different modernising influences to their historical memory and cultural heritage. At the time, Sikhs were often persecuted by the British, often being pressured or threatened into assimilating into mainstream culture. Acts such as publicly shaving off the heads and beards of religious Sikh officials were performed to humiliate and demean the Sikh religion. Amidst all this political discontent, Singh sought to revitalize the Sikh culture and religion through peaceful means, by writing a myriad of novels, epics, and poems. With the fall of the Sikh Empire and the modernization of Christian, Muslim, and Hindu movements of proselytism, the Sikh faith began to wane until scholars and theologians of the religions, Singh being a leading one, began revitalizing life into Sikhism through their works of literature.

Works 

Bhai Vir Singh began taking an  interest in the affairs of the Singh sabha movement. To promote its aims and objects, he launched the Khalsa Tract Society in 1894. The tracts produced by the Khalsa Tract Society introduced a new style of literary Punjabi.

The Khalsa Tract Society periodically made available under the title Nirguniara, low-cost publications on Sikh theology, history and philosophy and on social and religious reform. Through this journal, Singh established contact with an ever-expanding circle of readers. He used the Nirguniara as a vehicle for his own self-expression. Some of his major creative works such as Sri Guru Nanak Chamatkar and Sri Guru Kalgidhar Chamatkar, were originally serialised in its columns.

In literature, Singh started as a writer of novels which are considered forerunners of the Punjabi novel. His writings in this genre – Sundari (1898), Bijay Singh (1899), Satwant Kaur (published in two parts, I in 1900 and II in 1927), were aimed at recreating the heroic period (eighteenth century) of Sikh history. Through these novels he made available to his readers, models of courage, fortitude and human dignity. Singh championed the Sikh identity in a way that did not devalue other religions. He even reprimanded the violation and destruction the Hindu idols in Kashmir in his book, Avantipur de Khandar. Singh also criticized and discouraged religious fanaticism, citing those as victims of their own fears brought on by a fervent and obsessive belief.

The novel Subhagji da Sudhar Hathin Baba Naudh Singh, popularly known as Baba Naudh Singh (serialised in Nirguniara from 1907 onwards and published in book form in 1921), shares with the epic Rana Surat Singh (which he had started serialising in 1905) Vir Singh's interest in the theme of a widow's desperate urge for a reunion with her dead husband.

Soon after the publication of Rana Surat Singh in book form in 1919, he turned to shorter poems and lyrics. These included Dil Tarang (1920), Tarel Tupke (1921), Lahiran de Har (1921), Matak Hulare (1922), Bijlian de Har (1927) and Mere Sayian Jio (1953). Through these works, he paved the way for the emergence of the Punjabi poem.

In November 1899, he started a Punjabi weekly, the Khalsa Samachar. He revised and enlarged Giani Hazara Singh's dictionary, Sri Guru Granth Kosh, originally published in 1898. The revised version was published in 1927. He published critical editions of some of the old Sikh texts such as Sikhan di Bhagat Mala (1912), Prachin Panth Prakash (1914), Puratan Janam Sakhi (1926) and Sakhi Pothi (1950).

An important work was Singh's annotation of Santokh Singh's Sri Gur Pratap Suraj Granth, published from 1927 to 1935 in fourteen volumes.

Role of women in writings 
Unlike most of the popular religions, Sikhism stresses the equality between men and women and that it is even sinful to consider either sex above the other. Singh reflected this belief in his novels, and featured them in a number of strong female characters. In fact, his very first novel was Sundari, which featured Sunder Kaur, a woman who converted from Hinduism to Sikhism and then proceeded to lead a life of adventure in the jungles with a band of Sikh warriors. It was the first novel penned in the Punjabi language. Through Sundari, Singh hoped to embody all the ideals of Guru Nanak’s lessons. The book was well received by the Sikh community and gained popularity almost immediately. Other important female characters he wrote were Rani Raj Kaur, Satvant Kaur, Subhagji and Sushil Kaur. Even by today's modern standards, these female characters are still considered to be well rounded and an inspiration to both male and female Sikhs alike. Bhai Vir Singh went even as far as often portraying the women in his novels as more prone to spiritual enlightenment than her male counterpart.

Punjab & Sind Bank 
Bhai Vir Singh was one of the founders of the Punjab & Sind Bank. He co-found Punjab & Sind bank with his friends.

Awards 
He was honoured with the Sahitya Akademi Award in 1955 and the Padma Bhushan Award in 1956.

The Government of India released a stamp to commemorate Bhai sahib's birth centenary in 1972.

Posthumous Recognition 
The portion of his commentary on the Adi Granth – nearly one half of the Holy Book – he had completed was published posthumously in seven large volumes.

Bibliography

See also 
Surjit Patar
Ajeet Cour

References

Further reading 

Bhai Vir Singh: Life, Times and Works by Gurbachan Singh Talib and Attar Singh, ed., Chandigarh, 1973
Bhai Sahib Bhai Vir Singh Ji Books: MP3 audio and PDF books
Bhai Vir Singh Books: MP3 audio of books
Sundari : Read Sundari book in English
Books of Bhai Veer Singh Ji

History of Punjab
Indian Sikhs
1872 births
1957 deaths
Punjabi-language writers
Punjabi-language poets
Punjabi people
Writers from Amritsar
Sikh writers
Recipients of the Padma Bhushan in literature & education
Scholars of Sikhism
Recipients of the Sahitya Akademi Award in Punjabi
Scholars from Amritsar
19th-century Indian poets
20th-century Indian poets
Poets from Punjab, India